Zeno Coste (May 30 1907 - 1985) was a Romanian singer.

Life 
Zeno Coste was born in Ciacova, Banat, to Iuliu and Zoe Coste.

Before starting his singing career, Zeno was a talented athlete. From 1927 to 1930 he held the Romanian record in double-handed weight throwing.

From 1928 on, he studied music in Berlin and Milan. He was also successful in sports during his studies at the Technical University of Berlin, winning the university championships in shot put three times. In 1930 he played a singer in the first Romanian sound film, Ciuleandra.  In December 1930 he recorded several songs in Romanian for the Columbia label in Berlin. In 1931/32 he sang the Tenor voice with the vocal ensemble "Die Parker", which appeared on a number of records with the orchestras of Bernard Etté, Billy Bartholomew, Ilja Livschakoff and Georg Nettelmann. The group performed in two movies: Melodie der Liebe with Richard Tauber and Die spanische Fliege with Lizzi Waldmueller.

From 1932 to 1935 Zeno Coste was First Tenor with the Kardosch Singers, a successful vocal ensemble in the style of the Comedian Harmonists. The other members were Hungarians  István Kardos (piano and arrangements) and Pál Nyiri (Bass) and two Germans, Rudi Schuricke (Second Tenor) and Fritz Angermann (Baritone).

The Kardosch Singers completed tours in Denmark and the Netherlands, had radio appearances in Copenhagen, Hilversum, Frankfurt and Berlin, as well as concerts throughout Germany and a six-month engagement with the Theater am Kurfürstendamm in Berlin. Between 1932 and 1935, they recorded about 80 pieces for Telefunken, Odeon, and the Deutsche Grammophongesellschaft. The ensemble was involved in several film productions in 1932 and 1933,  most of which have not survived. In the 1933 film Roman einer Nacht they visibly appear as singers in a ball scene.

In early 1935, the Kardosch singers toured Germany with Barnabas von Géczy and his orchestra, as well as with Willy Reichert and his artists' troupe.

In November 1935 the group made their last records. Kardos and his wife were both of Jewish descent and Nyiri was married to a Jewish woman, so both couples went back to Hungary.

Coste stayed in Germany and had engagements at the Theater des Volkes in Berlin from December 1935 to February 1936. In the summer of 1936 he was signed on with the Meistersextett, one of the two successor groups to the Comedian Harmonists and  participated in their recordings between August and October of that year, most notably in "Ich wollt' ich wär ein Huhn". He was also signed on to sing with the Meistersextett for the film Und Du mein Schatz fährst mit in September 1936.

In 1937 he sang in the film La Habanera, and recorded four songs with Erhard Bauschke and his orchestra.

He returned to his native Romania in 1938. In 1942 and 1944 he sang the role of Rodolfo in "La Bohéme" under Antonin Ciolan and that of Alfred Germont in "La Traviata" at the Romanian National Opera in Iași.

He then returned to Banat where he worked as an engineer and was engaged as a solo singer with the Philharmonic Choir and the Cathedral Choir in Timișoara. He died in 1985.

Family 
HIs parents were attorney Iuliu Coste (1876-1967) and his wife Zoe (1885-1980). Iuliu Coste was prefect of Timis-Torontal twice in the 1920s. Zeno had two sisters, Zoe and Hortensia. Brutus Coste was his younger brother.

On 11 November 1935 he married Helene Anna Kryszewska (1910-1979) in Berlin-Wilmersdorf. The former Romanian national volleyball player Mihai Coste is his son.

Discography

As a solo singer 
Berlin, December 11, 1930

Columbia Tanzorchester, vocals Zeno Coste [for Romania]

 WHR 116 Oh Fräulein Grete
 WHR 117 Du hast ja eine Träne im Knopfloch
 WHR 118 Liebe für eine Nacht
 WHR 119 Eine Freundin so goldig wie du
 WHR 120 Pardon Madame!
 WHR 121 Good Night
 WHR 122 Liebling, mein Herz lässt dich grüßen

Berlin, December 12, 1930

Columbia Tanzorchester, vocals Zeno Coste [for Romania]

 WHR 123 So war es in Sanssouci
 WHR 124 Das Lied ist aus (Frag’ nicht warum!)
 WHR 125 Manuela
 WHR 126 Mie Cielito
 WHR 127 Warum hast du so traurige Augen?
 WHR 128 Pourquoi
 WHR 129 Mama … yo quiero un novio

Berlin, December 16, 1930

Columbia Tanzorchester, vocals Zeno Coste [for Romania]

 WHR 117-2 Du hast ja eine Träne im Knopfloch

Berlin, March 1937

Erhard Bauschke and his orchestra, vocals Zeno Costa

Grammophon 2570:

 Zwischen grünen Bergen steht ein kleines Haus
 Wenn die Glocken läuten

Grammophon 10604:

 Ein Edelweiß hast Du zum Abschied mir gegeben
 Barbara

With the Kardosch-Singers 
Discography

With The Parkers 
August 1931: Ilja Livschakoff und sein Orchester, Refrain „Die Parker“:

 4163 BD – Horch! Horch! 1. Teil – Grammophon 24208
 4164 1/2 BD – Horch! Horch! 2. Teil – Grammophon 24208
 4173 1/2 BD – Das ist die Liebe der Matrosen – Grammophon 24210

September 1931: Billy Bartholomew und sein Orchester – Refrain „Die Parker“:

 C 1528 – Im Salzkammergut, da kann man gut lustig sein – Kristall 3208
 C 1529 – Das ist die Liebe der Matrosen – Kristall 3209, 3224

September/Oktober 1931: Kristall-Orchester, Gesang: Quartett „Die Parker“

 C 1555-1 Volkslieder Potpourri 1. Teil – Kristall 1242
 C 1556-1 Volkslieder Potpourri 2. Teil – Kristall 1242

September oder Oktober 1931: Bernhard Etté und sein Orchester, Refrain „Die Parker“:

 C 1566 – Rosa, reizende Rosa – Kristall 3219
 C 1567 – Schön ist das Leben – Kristall 3218

5. November 1931: Lizzi Waldmüller, „Die Parker“ und Jean Gilbert mit seinem Orchester:

 OD 643-1 – Sag mir mal Schnucki auf spanisch – Electrola EG 2452

November 1931: Ilja-Livschakoff und sein Orchester, Gesang Leo Monosson und „Die Parker“:

 4136 BR – Für alle 1. Teil – Grammophon 24354
 4137 1/2 BR – Für alle 2. Teil – Grammophon 24354

Dezember 1931: Kurt Hardt mit Quartett „Die Parker“ mit Orchesterbegleitung:

 C 1601-1 – Es rauscht der Wald 1. Teil – Kristall 6069
 C 1602 – Es rauscht der Wald 2. Teil – Kristall 6069

Januar 1932: Bernhard Etté und sein Orchester, Gesang „Die Parker“:

 C 1625 – Für alle 1. Teil – Kristall 3235
 C 1626 – Für alle 2. Teil – Kristall 3235

Januar 1932: Kristall-Orchester, Gesang „Die Parker“:

 C 1634 – Wir walzen 1. Teil – Kristall 1633
 C 1635 – Wir walzen 2. Teil – Kristall 1633

Januar 1932: George Nettelmann und sein Orchester, Refrain: Kurt Mühlhardt und „Die Parker“:

 C 1647 – Morgen geht’s uns gut – Kristall 3239
 C 1649 – Potpourri aus dem Tonfilm „Bomben auf Monte Carlo“ – Kristall 3240

Frühling oder Sommer 1932: Kristall-Orchester und „Die Parker

 C 2181 Rheinischer Sang 1. Teil – Kristall 7203
 C 2182 Rheinischer Sang 2. Teil – Kristall 7203

With the Meistersextett 
August–September 1936:

ORA 1418 In Mexico - Electrola EG 3723, Electrola EG 3745, HMV AM 4744, HMV EG 3723, HMV EG 3745

ORA 1419 Ich woll' ich wär ein Huhn - Electrola EG 3723, Electrola EG 3743, HVM AM 4744, HMV EG 3723

ORA 1471 Ja, der Ozean ist groß - Electrola EG 3743

ORA 1472 Schreit alle Hurra! - Electrola EG 3745, HMV EG 3745

9. Oktober 1936:

ORA 1504 – Der Piccolino – Electrola EG 3763

ORA 1505 – Hand in Hand – Electrola EG 3763

Filmography 

 Ciuleandra
 Melodie der Liebe
 Die Spanische Fliege
 Ja, treu ist die Soldatenliebe
 Grün ist die Heide
 Moderne Mitgift
 Tausend für eine Nacht
 Wovon soll der Schornstein rauchen
 Roman einer Nacht
 Glückliche Reise
 Und du mein Schatz fährst mit
 La Habanera

External links 
 Biographie, photos, discography and filmography on kardosch-saenger.de
Zeno Coste on Discogs
 Photo of the Coste family in the 1930s on spotlight-timisoara.eu/
 The Coste family in the 1960s

Audio examples 
 Erhard Bauschke and his orchestra, vocals by Zeno Coste: Zwischen grünen Bergen steht ein kleines Haus
Erhard Bauschke and his orchestra, vocals by Zeno Coste: Wenn die Glocken läuten
Erhard Bauschke and his orchestra, vocals by Zeno Coste: Barbara
Erhard Bauschke and his orchestra, vocals by Zeno Coste: Ein Edelweiß hast du zum Abschied mir gegeben
Lizzi Waldmüller, Jean Gilbert and his orchestra, vocals "Die Parker": Sag mir mal Schnucki auf spanisch
Die Kardosch-Saenger: Morgen muss ich fort von hier
Die Kardosch-Saenger: Kaeti! (Waiting at the gate for Katy)

References 

1907 births
Romanian operatic tenors
People from Ciacova
Date of death missing
People from Timișoara
20th-century Romanian male opera singers